The 2007 FIA GT Brno 2 Hours was the eighth round of the 2007 FIA GT Championship season.  It took place at Masaryk Circuit, Czech Republic, on September 23, 2007.

Official results
Class winners in bold.  Cars failing to complete 75% of winner's distance marked as Not Classified (NC).  Cars with a C under their class are running in the Citation Cup, with the winner marked in bold italics.

† – #52 Racing Team Edil Cris was disqualified for failing post-race technical inspection.  The car was found to be below the legal ride height.

Statistics
 Pole Position – #1 Vitaphone Racing Team – 1:54.064
 Average Speed – 159.21 km/h

References

B